Paul Randolph may refer to:

Paul Randolph (Canadian football) (born 1968), Canadian football linebacker
Paul Randolph (musician), musician with Jazzanova
Paul Randolph (Under the Dome), fictional character
Paul Randolph, fictional character by Jo Sinclair

See also
Randolph E. Paul, tax lawyer